Gomez Nunatak is an isolated nunatak  southwest of Mount Vang, surmounting the interior ice plateau near the base of the Antarctic Peninsula. It was mapped by the United States Geological Survey from ground surveys and U.S. Navy air photos, 1961–67, and was named by the Advisory Committee on Antarctic Names for Jose M. Gomez, a mechanic with the Eights Station winter party in 1965.

References

Nunataks of Palmer Land